ZeroZeroZero is an Italian crime drama television series created by Stefano Sollima, Leonardo Fasoli and Mauricio Katz for Sky Atlantic, Canal+ and Amazon Prime Video. It is based on the book of the same name by Roberto Saviano, a study of the business around the drug cocaine, covering its movement across continents. The series stars Andrea Riseborough, Dane DeHaan and Gabriel Byrne as the American Lynwood family, controlling an international shipping company which acts as cocaine broker between Mexican and Italian organized crime. The series derives its name from the whitest, finest-milled type of wheat flour (000), which is "the nickname among narcotraffickers for the purest cocaine on the market."

The world premiere of ZeroZeroZero was on 5 September 2019 at the 76th Venice International Film Festival, where the first two episodes were screened out of competition. The series premiered on television on 14 February 2020 on Sky Atlantic in Italy. The series received generally favorable reviews.

Premise
The series follows the troubled journey of a large shipment of cocaine from Monterrey, Mexico to Gioia Tauro, Italy. The sellers are Mexican drug lords Enrique and Jacinto Leyra, who are aided in their criminal activities by Manuel Quinteras and his group of corrupt soldiers; the buyer is Don Minu La Piana, a boss of the 'Ndrangheta, whose position is challenged by his ambitious grandson Stefano and the Curtiga family; the brokers in charge of the shipment are the Lynwoods, an American family from New Orleans owning a prestigious shipping company. The infighting within the 'Ndrangheta causes the shipment to be rerouted to Morocco, and the delay has dramatic consequences for all the interested parties.

Cast

Main
 Andrea Riseborough as Emma Lynwood, eldest daughter of Edward Lynwood, running the family's shipping company
 Dane DeHaan as Chris Lynwood, Emma's younger brother, affected by Huntington's disease
 Giuseppe De Domenico as Stefano La Piana, a member of the 'Ndrangheta
 Adriano Chiaramida as Don Damiano "Minu" La Piana, a boss of the 'Ndrangheta and Stefano's grandfather
 Harold Torres as Manuel Quinteras, a soldier of the Mexican Army, secretly working for the Leyra brothers
 Noé Hernández as Varas, a commander of the Mexican Army
 Tchéky Karyo as François Salvage, a captain working for the Lynwoods
 Francesco Colella as Italo Curtiga, Stefano's ally
 Diego Cataño as Chino, a soldier of the Mexican Army
 Norman Delgadillo as Diego, a loyal soldier of the Mexican Army
 Nika Perrone as Lucia, Stefano's wife
 Gabriel Byrne  as Edward Lynwood, Chris and Emma's father and head of the family's shipping company
 Claudia Pineda as Chiquitita, Diego's wife
 Érick Israel Consuelo as Moko, a soldier of the Mexican Army
 Jesús Lozano as Gordo, a soldier of the Mexican Army
 José Salof as Indio, a soldier of the Mexican Army
 Flavio Medina as Jacinto Leyra, a Mexican narco
 Víctor Huggo Martín as Enrique Leyra, a Mexican narco and Jacinto's brother
 Seydina Baldé as Omar Gamby, Emma's fixer in Dakar
 Nabiha Akkari as Amina, daughter of Yasser, the Lynwoods' fixer in Casablanca, and Chris's love interest

Recurring

 José Carlos Rodríguez as Pastor Jorge
 Mostefa Djadja as Yasser, the Lynwoods' fixer in Casablanca and Amina's father

Episodes

Production

The series was shot in Mexico, Italy, Senegal, Morocco and the United States.

Distribution
The series premiered on 14 February 2020 on Sky Atlantic in Italy. It was released in its entirety on 6 March 2020 on Amazon Prime Video in the United States, Canada, Latin America and Spain. ZeroZeroZero premiered on 9 March 2020 on Canal+ in France, and on 26 March 2020 on Sky Atlantic in Germany and Austria. It premiered on 14 May 2020 on SBS and SBS On Demand in Australia. The series premiered on 4 February 2021 on Sky Atlantic in the United Kingdom and Ireland.

HBO Europe has distributed the series in all its countries (Spain excluded) from 14 February 2020.

Reception 
ZeroZeroZero has been well-received by critics. It has a 94% "fresh" rating on Rotten Tomatoes, with an average rating of 8/10, based on 34 reviews. The Critics Consensus states, "An addictive thriller whose greatest weakness is that it is at times too withholding, ZeroZeroZero will stick with you long after the credits roll. It holds a 75/100 rating on Metacritic based on 10 reviews, indicating "generally favorable" reviews.

Nick Allen of RogerEbert.com praised ZeroZeroZero as "the kind of thriller that makes such a deep impression because it can think big and small at the same time, uniting three gripping individual stories into one massive saga." Mike Hale of The New York Times characterized the show as a "three shows in one: an Italian mafia saga with rocky Calabrian hillsides and generational omertà; a Mexican narco thriller with lavish cartel violence; and, more improbably, an indie-movie-style American family drama and character study. The series toggles among the three stories, which are intimately connected but for the most part told separately, with occasional meetings that are invariably bad news for the characters involved." He compared the series unfavorably to the earlier Roberto Saviano-based series, Gomorrah, but praised the characterization and performances of Riseborough and DeHaan. Daniel Fienberg of The Hollywood Reporter wrote that ZeroZeroZero was "beautifully shot, but frustratingly limited on character," and adding that "genre familiarity may make ZeroZeroZero less fresh, but it remains quite watchable, if you can ignore its vaguely nihilistic streak, thanks to a good cast, confident direction and cinematography that's really quite stunning at times."

Soundtrack

A soundtrack album by Scottish band Mogwai was released on 1 May 2020.

References

External links 
 

2020s Italian drama television series
2020 Italian television series debuts
Sky Atlantic (Italy) television programmes
Works about Mexican drug cartels
Italian crime television series
Television series by StudioCanal
Television series about organized crime